Lucas David Baldunciel (born 22 March 1992) is an Argentine professional footballer who plays as a forward for Temperley.

Career
Baldunciel started his career with Nueva Chicago of Primera B Nacional. His professional debut, against Huracán on 7 April 2013, was one of three appearances he made during the 2012–13 Primera B Nacional, which ended with relegation to Primera B Metropolitana. Baldunciel scored his first goal in the next December, netting in a 2–0 win over Colegiales; with a goal versus Atlanta following in February 2014 as Nueva Chicago were promoted back to tier two. He stayed with the club for a total of seven seasons, one of which was in the Primera División after 2014 promotion, whilst scoring ten goals in one hundred and six matches.

On 30 June 2018, Baldunciel departed Nueva Chicago to sign for fellow Primera B Nacional team Gimnasia y Esgrima. His opening goals for them arrived in December against Olimpo and Atlético de Rafaela.

Career statistics
.

Honours
Nueva Chicago
Primera B Metropolitana: 2013–14

References

External links

1992 births
Living people
Footballers from Buenos Aires
Argentine footballers
Argentine expatriate footballers
Association football forwards
Primera Nacional players
Primera B Metropolitana players
Argentine Primera División players
Bolivian Primera División players
Nueva Chicago footballers
Gimnasia y Esgrima de Mendoza footballers
Club Atlético Temperley footballers
F.C. Motagua players
Argentine expatriate sportspeople in Bolivia
Argentine expatriate sportspeople in Honduras
Expatriate footballers in Bolivia
Expatriate footballers in Honduras